Alirajpur is a city in the Alirajpur tehsil in Alirajpur district in the state of Madhya Pradesh, India.

Alirajpur State was formerly a princely state of India, under the Bhopawar Agency in Central India. It lay in the Malwa region of Madhya Pradesh, near the border with Gujarat and Maharashtra. It had an area of 836 m². It had been from time to time under British administration. The Victoria bridge at Alirajpur was built to commemorate the Diamond Jubilee of 1897.

Demographics 
As of the 2001 India census, Alirajpur had a population of 25,161. Males constitute 52% of the population and females 48%. 15% of the population is under 6 years of age.

History
During the British Raj Alirajpur was the capital of Alirajpur State, one of the princely states of India.
After India got independence in the year 1947, the ruling family of Alirajpur State moved to Delhi, where the last ruler of Ali Rajpur, Surendra Singh, subsequently served as the Ambassador of India to Spain in the 1980s.

Geography 
Alirajpur's topography is predominantly hilly. Area-wise, the former Alirajpur taluka was larger than the Jhabua taluka of Jhabua district. Now Alirajpur is a District. The Rajwara fort is situated in the centre of the town.

Economy 
Its economy depends primarily on agricultural endeavours, especially farming, especially mangoes. The agricultural trading yard in Alirajpur is the biggest in the state when it comes to mango trading. Alirajpur is also a hub for dolomite business.

Transport

On 30 October 2019, a new railway line was inaugurated between Alirajpur station and Pratapnagar station in Vadodara.  Alirajpur is connected by bus to Indore and nearby districts.

References 

Adivasi Song Download popular tribal songs of alirajpur

 
Cities and towns in Alirajpur district
Jhabua
States and territories established in 1437